Mather Byles II (12 January 1734/1735 – 12 March 1814), was a Congregational clergyman at New London, Connecticut Colony until 1768. In 1768 he entered the Established Church, and became rector of Christ Church, Boston.

Sympathizing with the royal cause, he settled, after the War of Independence in Halifax, Nova Scotia as Chaplain to the Garrison and later in Saint John, New Brunswick, where he was rector of a church until his death.

The son of Mather Byles (1706–1788), he graduated from Harvard College in 1751 at the age of twelve, and later received his MA from the school. He also graduated from Yale College and the University of Oxford.

References

Further reading
 

Canadian Anglican priests
American Congregationalists
United Empire Loyalists
American emigrants to pre-Confederation New Brunswick
Harvard College alumni
Harvard College Loyalists in the American Revolution
Clergy from Boston
1735 births
1814 deaths
Harvard University librarians
Yale College alumni
Alumni of the University of Oxford